Slim Callaghan Intervenes (German: Slim Callaghan greift ein) is a 1964 West German crime television series broadcast on ZDF in eight episodes. The programme was based on the series of novels by British writer Peter Cheyney featuring the London-based private detective Slim Callaghan. In the television adaptation Callaghan is operating his own agency in Munich. He is played by Viktor de Kowa while Eva Pflug featured as his loyal secretary Steffie.

Main cast
 Viktor de Kowa as  Slim Callaghan
 Eva Pflug as Steffie
 Helmuth Rudolph as  Inspektor Dallmüller

Other actors who appeared in episodes of the series include Carla Hagen, Grit Boettcher, Hanne Wieder, Ellen Frank, Ursula Herking, Walter Janssen, Karl Schönböck, Jan Hendriks, Ulrich Beiger, Alexander Golling, Dieter Eppler, Hellmut Lange, Lukas Ammann, Rosemarie Fendel, Tatjana Sais, Maria Landrock and Peter Carsten.

References

Bibliography
 Compart, Martin . Crime TV: Lexikon der Krimi-Serien. Bertz + Fischer, 2000.
 Hruska, Thomas. Der neue Serien Guide: S-Z. Schwarzkopf & Schwarzkopf, 2004

External links
 

1964 German television series debuts
1964 German television series endings
1960s crime television series
German-language television shows
German crime television series
Television shows set in Munich

de:Slim Callaghan greift ein